Azad Nagar (officially, Medimix Azad Nagar) is a metro station on Line 1 of the Mumbai Metro serving the Azad Nagar neighbourhood of Andheri in Mumbai, India. It opened to the public on 8 June 2014.

History

Station layout

Connections

Exits

See also
Public transport in Mumbai
List of Mumbai Metro stations
List of rapid transit systems in India
List of Metro Systems

References

External links

The official site of Mumbai Metro
 UrbanRail.Net – descriptions of all metro systems in the world, each with a schematic map showing all stations.

Mumbai Metro stations
Railway stations in India opened in 2014
2014 establishments in Maharashtra